Makayla Rudder (born 1 July 2001) is a footballer who plays as a forward. Born in Canada, she plays for the Guyana women's national team.

Early life
Rudder played youth soccer with Unionville Milliken SC and FC Durham.

College career
In 2019, Rudder began attending Durham College, playing for the women's soccer team. In her rookie season, she scored a team-high nine goals and was named an OCAA East Division second-team All-Star.

International career
Rudder represented Guyana U20 at the 2020 CONCACAF Women's U-20 Championship.

In 2021, Rudder was named to the senior roster ahead of friendly matches against Puerto Rico. On October 20, he made her debut in a 6–1 loss to Puerto Rico.

References

External links
Durham College profile

2001 births
Living people
Citizens of Guyana through descent
Guyanese women's footballers
Women's association football forwards
Guyana women's international footballers
Canadian women's soccer players
Canadian sportspeople of Guyanese descent
Black Canadian women's soccer players
Unionville Milliken SC (women) players